Caryocolum crepusculella is a moth of the family Gelechiidae. It was described by Karl August Teich from Latvia.

This species was described from two syntypes collected on 27 June and 2 July on swamp land. According to the original description, C. crepusculella is related to Caryocolum vicinella and Caryocolum fischerella. However, the real identity of this species remains obscure as the Teich collection was destroyed.

References

Moths described in 1903
crepusculella
Moths of Europe